General elections were held in Siam on 6 January 1946 to elect 96 of the 192 members of the House of Representatives. The other 96 members were appointed by the King. Voter turnout was 32.5%.

At the time there were no political parties, so all candidates ran as independents.

Results

Aftermath
Following the promulgation of a new constitution later in 1946, the appointed seats were abolished and the number of elected seats expanded to 178. Elections were held in August 1946 to elect an additional 82 members and political parties were allowed to contest the elections for the first time. Supporters of Pridi Banomyong (Sahachip Party and the Constitutional Front) took 57 seats, the Democrat Party took 18 seats and seven seats went to unaffiliated representatives.

References

Siam
General
Elections in Thailand
Election and referendum articles with incomplete results
Non-partisan elections